Pommes soufflées are a variety of French fried potato. The potato slices puff up into little pillows during the second frying and turn golden brown.

Chef Jean-Louis Françoise-Collinet, reputedly also the inventor of sauce béarnaise, removed the potatoes from the fryer half cooked. After the royal party had arrived, during serving time, he observed the potatoes expand when they were returned to the oil. This story has been disputed on a number of grounds.

See also
 List of deep fried foods
 Triple-cooked chips

References

Potato dishes
Deep fried foods
French cuisine